Fakhreddine II Palace is a 17th-century palace in Deir el Qamar, Chouf District, Lebanon. It was built by Emir Fakhr-al-Din II in the early 17th century. It houses the Marie Baz Museum, a wax work museum.

See also
 Fakhreddine Mosque

References

External links
Deir el Qamar Website

Palaces in Lebanon